The Biella Synagogue is an early 17th-century synagogue in Biella, Italy. 

The synagogue occupies the top floor of a medieval house at Vicolo del Bellone 3, in the heart of the historic Jewish quarter. It is a modestly sized, rectangular room with baroque decoration, a central bimah and an ornate, seventeenth century, baroque Torah Ark.

The synagogue possesses the oldest known Torah scroll still in use which dates to the 13th century.

In 2009 a 350,000 euro restoration, overseen by the Jewish community in Vercelli and funded from the Piedmont Region and by donations from a number of sources, including a local bank, completed the repair of the roof, and restoration of the Torah Ark, women's gallery and interior. Further restoration work is planned.

The Biella Synagogue is one of about sixteen that survive in Piedmont, including the Synagogue of Casale Monferrato and the Vercelli Synagogue.

References 

Baroque synagogues in Italy
Synagogues in Piedmont
Synagogue
17th-century synagogues